Daniel Grenon (born July 31, 1948 in Saint-Fargeau) is a French businessman and politician of the National Rally who has been a Member of the National Assembly for Yonne's 1st constituency.

Biography
Grenon was born in 1948 in Saint-Fargeau. He was the owner of a grocery store and delicatessen in Puisaye for several years before retiring. He was also the president of several local sports associations, including an archery club.

He was a longterm supporter of the National Rally before getting involved in politics. During the French regional elections in 2021, Grenon was elected as a councilor in Puisaye along with Julien Odoul. For the 2022 French legislative election, he contested Yonne's 1st constituency and took the seat in the second round defeating EELV and NUPES affiliated candidate 	Florence Loury.

References 

Living people
1948 births
Deputies of the 16th National Assembly of the French Fifth Republic
21st-century French politicians
National Rally (France) politicians